Du Haitao (born 28 October 1987), is a Chinese television host and actor. Du is known for hosting the Hunan TV variety show Happy Camp.

Career 

In 2005, Du competed in the Hunan TV hosting competition Shining New Anchor. Winning the competition in 2006, Du, along with runner-up Wu Xin, joined the Happy Camp as a host, with existing members He Jiong, Xie Na, and Li Weijia, forming the Happy Family. The same year, Du hosted the education program Tong Xin Zhuang Di Qiu (Chinese: 童心撞地球) for the cartoon department of Hunan TV. 

In 2009, Du, together with Wu Xin, authored the memoir Tu Mu Ri Xin (Chinese 木土日斤), documenting their early experiences working for Happy Camp. The title name of the novel is a word play on the their names. 

In 2013, Du and the Happy Family starred in the comedy film Bring Happiness Home. In 2015, Du featured on the variety show Takes a Real Man on Hunan TV. 

In 2020, Du featured on the third season of the Tencent Video dating show the Heart Signal.

Personal life
Since Du began hosting Happy Camp, it was rumored that Du had been dating Wu Xin; the two later dismissed the rumors. In 2011, Du began dating Li Ruoxi. Since 2016, Du has been in a relationship with model and actress Shen Mengchen.

On 18 February 2022, Du married Shen Mengchen.

Filmography

Films

Television

Books
Muturijin（木土日斤） 2009

Music composition
Albums: Happiness you understand (快乐你懂的) Released: 25 September 2010
Personal single song: Tomboy

References

External 
Du Haitao on Weibo

Living people
1987 births
Chinese television presenters
21st-century Chinese male actors
Chinese male film actors
Chinese male television actors
Place of birth missing (living people)
Participants in Chinese reality television series